Parlor, Bedroom and Bath is a lost 1920 American silent comedy film produced and released by Metro Pictures and directed by Edward Dillon. The film stars Ruth Stonehouse and Eugene Pallette.

It is based on the 1917 Broadway play Parlor, Bedroom and Bath by Charles William Bell and Mark Swan which was produced by A. H. Woods.

The play was filmed again as Parlor, Bedroom and Bath at MGM in 1931 with Buster Keaton and Charlotte Greenwood.

Cast
Eugene Pallette as Reggie Irving
Ruth Stonehouse as Polly Hathaway
Kathleen Kirkham as Angelica Irving
Charles H. West as Jeffrey Haywood
Dorothy Wallace as Virginia Irving
Helen Sullivan as Leila
Henry Miller, Jr. as Ferdie Eaton
George Periolat as Fred Leslie
Josephine Hill as Nita Leslie
Graham Pettie as Barkis

References

External links

allmovie/synopsis; Parlor, Bedroom and Bath

1920 films
American silent feature films
Lost American films
American films based on plays
Films directed by Edward Dillon
1920 comedy films
Silent American comedy films
American black-and-white films
Metro Pictures films
1920 lost films
Lost comedy films
1920s American films